In enzymology, a N-isopropylammelide isopropylaminohydrolase is an enzyme that catalyzes the chemical reaction

N-isopropylammelide + H2O  cyanuric acid + isopropylamine

Thus, the two substrates of this enzyme are N-isopropylammelide and H2O, whereas its two products are cyanuric acid and isopropylamine.

This enzyme belongs to the family of hydrolases, those acting on carbon-nitrogen bonds other than peptide bonds, specifically in compounds that have not been otherwise categorized within EC number 3.5.  The systematic name of this enzyme class is N-isopropylammelide isopropylaminohydrolase. This enzyme is also called AtzC.  This enzyme participates in atrazine degradation.

Structural studies

As of late 2007, only one structure has been solved for this class of enzymes, with the PDB accession code .

References

 

EC 3.5.99
Enzymes of known structure